OnTV4U (often capitalized as ONTV4U) is an American television network that airs a 24/7 infomercial format, owned by Burlington, Wisconsin-based Cannella Media LLC, which was founded by Frank Cannella in 1985. It can be seen through various cable providers and on the following over-the-air stations;

Affiliates (partial list)
KAJF-LD 21.7 - Topeka, Kansas
WZCK 8.1 - Madison, Wisconsin
W23BW 23.3 - Madison, Wisconsin
WRJT 34.7 - Wausau, Wisconsin
W35DQ-D 24.4 - Midland, Michigan
WLEK-LD 22.2 & 22.4 - Boston, Massachusetts
WZME 43.12 Bridgeport, Connecticut/New York
KPDF-CD 41.6 - Phoenix, Arizona
KHDF-CD 19.4 & 19.6 - Las Vegas, Nevada
KTOU-LD 21.5 - Oklahoma City, Oklahoma
KAHC-LD 43.1 - Sacramento, California
WTBM-CD 24.3 - Birmingham, Alabama
WSDI-LD 30.1 - Indianapolis, Indiana
WQDE-LD 33.1 - Indianapolis, Indiana
KQML-LD 46.2 - Topeka, Kansas
WOST 14.2 - Mayagüez, Puerto Rico
KCMN-LD 42.5 - Topeka, Kansas
KPOM-CD 14.12 - Los Angeles, California
KAZD 55.12 - Lake Dallas, Texas
KFFV 44.12 - Seattle, Washington
WWBK-LD 28.6 - Richmond, Virginia
WFWG-LD 30.2 - Richmond, Virginia
W25FG-D 36.1 - Philadelphia, Pennsylvania
WDUM-LD 41.1 - Philadelphia, Pennsylvania
KYAZ 51.12 - Houston, Texas
W16CC-D 16.7 - Miami, Florida

Former affiliates
KAJF 21.5 - Topeka, Kansas (now affiliated with Lx)
KBTV-CD 8.2 - Sacramento, California (now affiliated with Visión Latina)
KUSE-LD - Seattle, Washington (now a Cheddar affiliate)
WEBR-CD - New York City (now public television station WNDT-CD; affiliated with FNX)

References

External links
ONTV4U.com - Official Website

Television networks in the United States
Infomercials
Shopping networks in the United States